This is a list of notable people from Brussels.

Patroness of Brussels

 Saint Gudulae of Brussels and Eibingen, Saint of the city and national saint of Belgium

Political leaders in Brussels

The Belgian Monarchs

The Belgian Monarchs reside in Brussels, the capital of Belgium. They were all born in Brussels (except for Leopold I).

 Leopold I (1790–1865), the first King of the Belgians
 Leopold II (1835–1909), the second King of the Belgians
 Albert I (1875–1934), the third King of the Belgians
 Leopold III (1901–1983), the fourth King of the Belgians
 Baudouin (1930–1993), the fifth King of the Belgians
 Albert II (born 1934; abdicated 2013), the sixth King of the Belgians
 Philippe (born 1960), the seventh King of the Belgians

Minister-Presidents of Brussels

 Charles Picqué (P.S.) (1989–1999)
 Jacques Simonet (M.R.) (1999–2000)
 François-Xavier de Donnéa (M.R.) (2000–2003)
 Daniel Ducarme (M.R.) (2003–2004)
 Jacques Simonet (M.R.) (2004) (replaced Daniel Ducarme who resigned)
 Charles Picqué (P.S.) (2004–2013)
 Rudi Vervoort (P.S.) (2013–present)

Governors of Brussels

 André Degroeve (1995–1998)
 Raymonde Dury (1998) (resigned)
 Véronique Paulus de Châtelet (1998)

Mayors of Brussels

Joseph Van De Meulebroeck (lib.) (1939–1956)
Lucien Cooremans (lib.) (1956–1975)
Pierre Van Halteren (lib.) (1975–1982)
Hervé Brouhon (P.S.) (1977–1983)
Freddy Thielemans (P.S.) (1983–1988)
Michel Demaret (PSC, now CdH) 1989–1994)
François-Xavier de Donnéa (M.R.) (1995–2000)
Freddy Thielemans (P.S.) (2001)

Born in Brussels

Following notable people were born in the area today known as the Brussels-Capital Region.

Royals 
 Mary of Burgundy (1457–1482), Duchess of Burgundy from 1477–1482
 Charles VII (1697–1745), Holy Roman Emperor
 Charles Eugene (1728–1793), Duke of Württemberg
 Princess Joséphine-Charlotte of Belgium (1927–2005), Grand Duchess of Luxembourg
 Princess Luisa Maria at Clinique Saint Jean in 1995
 Princess Laetitia Maria  at Clinique Saint Jean in 2003

Politicians 
 Paul Deschanel (1855–1922), president of France (1920)
 Antoine Duquesne (1941–2010), Belgian MP and Senator, Member of the European Parliament
 Pierre Harmel (1911–2009), Prime Minister of Belgium (1965–1966)
 Marie Janson (1873–1960), politician
 Paul-Emile Janson (1872–1944), Prime Minister of Belgium (1937–1938)
 Philippe Lamberts (born 1963), politician
 Adolphe Max (1869–1939), politician and Mayor of Brussels from 1909 until 1939
 Annemie Neyts (born 1944), politician, former president of the Liberal International, president of the European Liberal Democrat and Reform Party
 Charles-Ferdinand Nothomb (born 1936), politician
 Étienne Pinte, French MP and mayor of Versailles
 Paul-Henri Spaak (1899–1972), Prime Minister of Belgium (1938–1939, 1946 and 1947–1949), President of the United Nations General Assembly (1946–1957), Secretary-General of NATO (1957–1961)
 Emile Vandervelde (1866–1938), President from 1900 of the Second International

Artists

Cinema 
 Chantal Akerman (1950–2015), filmmaker and director
 Patrick Bauchau (born 1938), actor
 Gérard Corbiau (born 1941), film director
 Thierry De Mey (born 1956), film director and composer
 Jacques Feyder (1885–1948), screenwriter and international film director, one of the founders of poetic realism in French cinema
 Fernand Gravey (1904–1970), also known as Fernand Gravet, film actor
 Audrey Hepburn (1929–1993), Anglo-Dutch actress, fashion model, and humanitarian
 Helena Noguerra (born 1969), actress, singer and television presenter
 Raymond Rouleau (1904–1981), actor and film director
 Jean-Claude Van Damme (born 1960), actor, nicknamed "The Muscles from Brussels"
 Jaco Van Dormael (born 1957 in Ixelles), film director
 Alexandra Vandernoot (born 1965), actress
 Agnès Varda (1928–2019), French film director

Performance / dance  
 Akarova (Marguerite Acarin, 1904–1991), dancer, choreographer and artist
 Jan De Cock (born 1976), visual artist
 Clémentine de Vère (1888–1973), magician and illusionist 
 Hilda Madsen (1910–1981), British-American artist and dog breeder

Music 
 Stromae (Paul van Haver) (born 1985) musician
 Plastic Bertrand (Roger Jouret) (born 1958), rock musician
 Jacques Brel (1929–1978), singer-songwriter and actor
 Jean-Luc De Meyer (born 1963), musician, lead singer of Front 242
 Lara Fabian (born Lara Crokaert, 1970), singer
 Richard Jonckheere (born 1965), musician, member of Front 242
 Magali Luyten (born 1978), singer
 Victor-Charles Mahillon (1841–1924), musician and writer on musical topics
 Brian Molko (born 1972), songwriter, lead vocalist and guitarist of the band Placebo
 Pierre Rapsat (1948–2002), singer and musician
 The Singing Nun (Jeanine Deckers) (1933–1985), member of a Dominican Convent, famous for her song "Dominique"
 Edna Stern (born 1977), pianist
 Toots Thielemans (1922–2016), jazz musician
 Tonia (born Arlette Antoine Dominicus, 1947), singer
 Angèle Van Laeken (born 1995), singer-songwriter
 Ghalia Volt, blues rock musician and songwriter
 Régine Zylberberg (born 1929), pioneer of the modern nightclub

Painting / sculpture / architecture / other
 Pierre Alechinsky (born 1927), artist
 Richard Aurili, (1864- 1943), sculptor
 Colijn de Coter (c. 1446–1538), Renaissance painter
 Lodewijk de Vadder (1605–1655), landscape painter
 Francois Duquesnoy (1597–1643), sculptor
 Alfred Jonniaux (1882–1974), portrait painter
 Constantin Meunier (1831, Etterbeek –1905), painter and sculptor
 Joseph Noiret (1927–2012), painter, writer and poet
 Joseph Poelaert (1817–1879), architect, author of the Palais de Justice
 Paul Saintenoy (1862–1952), architect
 Jean Henri Simon (1752–1834), engraver and soldier
 Jean Stevo (1914–1974), painter and engraver
 Arnt van der Dussen, medieval tapestry maker
 Juliette Wytsman (1866–1925), painter

Fashion 
 Liz Claiborne (1929–2007), fashion designer
 Diane von Fürstenberg (born 1946), Belgian-American fashion designer
 Stella Maxwell (born 1990), Belgian born British fashion model

Literature / cartoon 
 Julio Cortázar (1914–1984), Argentine novelist and poet
 Jacques Danois (1927–2008), actor, journalist, writer
 Michel De Ghelderode (1898–1962), dramatist
 André Fontainas (1865–1948), Symbolist poet and critic
 André Franquin (1924–1997), cartoonist
 Jacqueline Harpman (1929-2012), novelist
 Hergé (Georges Remi) (1907–1983), Belgian cartoonist, creator of The Adventures of Tintin
 Edgar P. Jacobs (1904–1987), comics writer, created the series that made him famous, Blake and Mortimer
 Auguste Jouhaud (1805–1888), writer and playwright
 Camille Lemonnier (1844–1913), writer
 Pierre Mertens (born 1939), writer, director of the Centre de sociologie de la littérature at the Université Libre de Bruxelles
 Henri Horace Meyer (1801–1870), French dramatist and novelist
 Jeanine Moulin (1912–1998), poet and literary scholar
 Paul Nougé (1895–1967), surrealist poet and philosopher
 Hubert Nyssen (1925–2011), Belgian-French writer
 Peyo (Pierre Culliford) (1928–1992), illustrator and creator of the Smurfs
 Edmond Picard (1836–1924), jurist and writer
 François Schuiten (born 1956), comics artist
 Benoît Sokal (1954–2021), Belgian comic artist and video game developer
 Charles Spaak (1903–1975), screenwriter
 Philippe Tome (Philippe Vandevelde), (1957–2019), comic strip writer
 Jean-Philippe Toussaint (born 1957), writer, Prix Médicis 2005
 Jean Van Hamme (born 1939), novelist and scenario writer of comic books
 Geert van Istendael (born 1947 in Uccle), writer
 François Weyergans (1941–2019), writer, Prix Goncourt 2005
 Marguerite Yourcenar (1903–1987), French writer and first female member of the Académie française

Scientists 
 Jean-Jacques Cassiman (born 1943 in Sint-Jans-Molenbeek), researcher and professor of human genetics
 François d'Aguilon or Aguilonius (1546–1617), mathematician and physicist
 Pierre Deligne (born 1944), mathematician
 François Englert, Nobel Prize in Physics 2013
 Robert Goldschmidt (1877-1935), chemist and physician
 Éliane Gubin (born 1942), Belgian historian, researcher and professor
 Friedrich Moritz Hartogs (1874–1943), German-Jewish mathematician
 Jean Jeener (born 1931), physical chemist and physicist
 Claude Lévi-Strauss (1908–2009), French anthropologist
 Joseph Plateau (1801–1883), physicist; invented an early stroboscopic device, the phenakistiscope
 Jacques Tits (1930–2021), Belgian-French mathematician
 Jan Baptist van Helmont (1579–1644), chemist, physiologist and physician
 Pierre François Verhulst (1804–1849), mathematician
 Andreas Vesalius (1514–1564), anatomist and author of the first complete textbook on human anatomy, De Humani Corporis Fabrica (On the Workings of the Human Body)
 Daniel Zajfman (born 1959), Israeli physicist; president of the Weizmann Institute

Intellectuals / religion 
 Victor Amédée Jacques Marie Coremans (1802–1872), archivist, journalist, and historian
 Pieter Crockaert (1470–1514), philosopher and theologian of the Southern Netherlands
 Henri La Fontaine (1854–1943), lawyer and president of the International Peace Bureau, Nobel Prize for Peace in 1913
 Henri Kichka (1926–2020), writer and Holocaust survivor
 Xavier de Mérode (1820–1874), prelate, archbishop and statesman of the Papal states
 Victor Serge (1890–1947), Russian revolutionary
 Pascal Vanderveeren (born 1946), lawyer and president of the International Criminal Bar
 Louise van den Plas (1877–1968), suffragist, activist

Sports 
 Henri Anspach (1882–1979), épée (Olympic champion) and foil fencer
 Paul Anspach (1882–1991), épée and foil fencer, two-time Olympic champion
 Thierry Boutsen (born 1957), Formula One driver
 Raymond Goethals (1921–2004), (national) soccer trainer; his team Olympique Marseille won the 1993 European Cup
 Georges Grün (born 1962), football (soccer) defender
 Jacky Ickx (born 1945), racing driver
 Aaron Leya Iseka (born 1997), footballer
 Manu Lecomte (born 1995), basketball player in the Israeli Basketball Premier League
 Paul Loicq (1888–1953), president of the International Ice Hockey Federation
 Vincent Kompany (born 1986), football (soccer) player
 Axel Merckx (born 1972 in Uccle), son of Eddy Merckx, professional road bicycle racer, bronze medal Olympic road race 2004
 Tarec Saffiedine (born 1986), martial artist
 Philippe Thys (1890–1971), cyclist and three-time winner of the Tour de France
 Ivo Van Damme (1954–1976), middle distance runner, silver medals at the 1976 Summer Olympics, in both the 800m and 1500m; Memorial van Damme in Brussels, one of the major track and field meets of the season, named in his honour
 Constant Vanden Stock (1914–2008), president and player of Brussels football club R.S.C. Anderlecht
 Franky Vercauteren (born 1956), football left winger in R.S.C. Anderlecht and R.W.D. Molenbeek, football manager in R.S.C. Anderlecht and national soccer trainer

Miscellaneous 
 Augustine De Rothmaler (1859-1942, pedagogue, feminist
 Marc Dutroux (born 1956), serial criminal
 Maxime Weygand (1867–1965), French military commander

Life and work in Brussels

Following notable people lived or worked in Brussels at least during a certain period of their life.

 Jean Absil (1893–1974 in Brussels),  composer, organist, and professor at the Brussels Conservatory
 Nicolas Ancion (born 1971), writer, lived and worked 1994–2000 in Brussels 
 Henryk Arctowski (1871–1958), scientist and Arctic explorer, worked at the Royal Observatory of Belgium from 1903 to 1909
 Arno (born 1949), rock artist from Ostend, lived a while in Brussels
 Maurice Béjart (1927–2007), French choreographer; founded the Ballet du XXe Siècle in 1960 and the Mudra School in 1970, both in Brussels
 Jules Bordet (1870–1961), immunologist and microbiologist; founded the Pasteur Institute in Brussels; inner of the 1919 Nobel Prize in Medicine
 Jeroen Brouwers (born 1940), Dutch author, lived from 1964 until 1976 in Brussels
 Pieter Brueghel the Elder (c. 1525–1569), painter
 Jan Bucquoy (born 1945), filmmaker and director
 Gerald Bull (1928–1990), Canadian engineer, lived and assassinated in Uccle
 Hendrik Conscience (1812–1883), writer
 Alexandra David-Néel (1868–1969), explorer and writer
 Anne Teresa de Keersmaeker (born 1960), choreographer; founded the dance company Rosas in 1983 and the dance school P.A.R.T.S. in 1995 in Brussels
 Marc Didden (born 1949) film director, made Brussels By Night (1983)
Adil El Arbi (born 1988), film director
 Desiderius Erasmus (c. 1466–1536), humanist and theologian; lived in Anderlecht (Erasmus House) from 31 May until 28 October 1521
 M. C. Escher (1898–1972), Dutch graphic designer, lived in Uccle from 1937 to 1971
 François-Joseph Fétis (1784–1871), musicologist, composer, critic and teacher, one of the most influential music critics of the 19th century; became director of the conservatory of Brussels and the chapelmaster of King Leopold I
 Jan Greshoff (1888–1971), Dutch writer, lived from 1927 until 1939 in Schaerbeek on the August Reyerslaan 130
 Ania Guédroïtz (born 1949), Belgian actress
 Willem Frederik Hermans (1921–1995), Dutch author.
 Victor Horta (1861–1947), architect, one of the most influential European Art Nouveau architects
 Enver Hoxha (1908–1985), Albanian dictator, worked as secretary at the Albanian consulate in Brussels from 1934 to 1936
 Nicholas Lens, author, composer
 René Magritte (1898–1967), surrealist artist
 Ian McCulloch (born 1959), singer of the English rock band Echo & the Bunnymen
 Eddy Merckx (born 1945), considered by many to be the greatest cyclist of all-time; spent youth and adolescence in Brussels
 Jef Mermans (1922–1996), nicknamed "The Bomber", football striker who played much of his career at R.S.C. Anderlecht
 Edward Mosberg (1926-2022), Polish-American Holocaust survivor, educator, and philanthropist
 Eugene Nida (1914–2011), linguist, developer of the dynamic-equivalence Bible-translation theory
 Amélie Nothomb (born 1967), novelist, writing in French
 Emma Orczy (1865–1947), Hungarian-British novelist, spent part of her childhood in Brussels (1868 to 1873)
 Marius Petipa (1818–1910), French ballet choreographer, lived in Brussels from 1824 to 1834 and studied at the Royal Conservatory
 Ilya Prigogine (1917–2003), physicist and chemist; studied chemistry in Brussels and was appointed in 1959 director of the International Solvay Institute in Brussels; awarded the 1977 Nobel Prize in Chemistry
 Adolphe Quetelet (1796–1874 in Brussels), astronomer, mathematician, statistician and sociologist; founded and directed the Brussels Observatory; inventor of the body mass index
 Vini Reilly (Vincent Reilly, born 1953), rock musician, guitarist of the English band The Durutti Column; performed on Morrissey's first solo album in 1988
 Jan van Ruysbroeck (also known as Jan van den Berghe), architect of the 15th century; amongst his work is the belfry of the Hotel de Ville of Brussels
 John of Ruysbroeck (or Jan, Jean, Johannes) (c. 1293–1381), 'mystic', priest in Brussels and Groenendaal
 Jan Zygmunt Skrzynecki (1787–1860), Polish general, high-ranking officer of the Belgian army from 1832 to 1839
 Ernest Solvay (1838–1922), chemist, industrialist and philanthropist; founded institutes and the Solvay Business School in Brussels
 Nicolas de Staël (born Nikolai Vladimirovich Stael von Holstein, 1914–1955), Russian-French abstract painter; lived in Uccle from 1922 to the early 1930; studied at the Académie Royale des Beaux-Arts
 Olivier Strelli (born Nissim Israël, 1946), fashion designer
 Pieter Coecke van Aelst (1502–1550), painter
 Rogier van der Weyden (c. 1399–1464), painter
 Emond van Dynter (c. 1370–1449), writer
 Vincent van Gogh (1853–1890), Dutch painter, studied at the Académie Royale des Beaux-Arts in Brussels from 1880 to 1881
 Paul Van Himst (born 1943), nicknamed Polle Gazon, football player, four-times winner of the Belgian Golden Shoe award, eight-times winner of the Belgian championship with R.S.C. Anderlecht
 Bernaert van Orley (c. 1488–1541), Renaissance painter
 Johan Verminnen (born 1951), singer-songwriter
 George Washington (1871–1946), inventor and first commercial producer of instant coffee, grew up in Brussels
 Henryk Wieniawski (1835–1880), violinist and composer, taught at the Royal Conservatory of Brussels from 1874 to 1877.
 Antoine Wiertz (1806–1865), painter and sculptor
 Jan Yoors (1922–1977), Flemish artist, studied at La Cambre from 1941 to 1942

Brussels as a safe harbor

Brussels was known to be a safe harbor for artists and thinkers facing political (or simply criminal) persecution. This was particularly true during the 19th century, although it was a cause of some debate, and policies were prone to change (e.g. the case of Karl Marx and Friedrich Engels, who were expelled from the city in 1848).
 Charles Baudelaire (1821–1867), French poet
 Louis Blanc (1811–1882), French poet, French politician and historian
 Georges Boulanger (1837–1891), French general and politician
 Jacques-Louis David (1748–1825), French painter
 José de San Martin (1824–1830), Argentine General and 1st President of Peru
 Alexandre Dumas, père (1802–1870), French author, known for his historical novels
 Friedrich Engels (1820–1895), German social scientist and political philosopher, co-author of The Communist Manifesto
 Willem Frederik Hermans (1921–1995), Dutch writer
 Victor Hugo (1802–1885),  one of the most influential French writers of the 19th century; completed Les Misérables in Brussels
 Joachim Lelewel (1786–1861), Polish historian and politician, associate of Karl Marx, lived in Brussels from 1833 to 1861
 Karl Marx (1818–1883), German political philosopher, wrote The Communist Manifesto in Brussels
 Multatuli (Eduard Douwes Dekker) (1820–1887), Dutch author, wrote his masterpiece Max Havelaar in 1859 in Brussels
 Cyprian Norwid (1821–1883), Polish poet, stayed in Brussels from August 1846 to January 1847 after his expulsion from Prussia
 Pierre-Joseph Proudhon (1809–1865), French philosopher, the first individual to call himself an "anarchist"
 Auguste Rodin (1840–1917), French sculptor
 Paul Verlaine (1844–1896), French poet; was joined briefly by the French poet Arthur Rimbaud

References 

Brussels
Brussels
People
Brussels